Gobble may refer to:

 Jimmy Gobble, Major League Baseball pitcher
 A turkey call
 A slang word for eating quickly
 A slang word for fellatio
 a group of 48 bits
 Gobbles, a fictional turkey in the South Park episode Helen Keller! The Musical